Sir Sidney Meadows (c. 1699 – 15 November 1792) was a British Member of Parliament.

Biography
He was the eldest son of the diplomat Sir Philip Meadowes (d.1757), of Brompton, Kensington, and his wife Dorothy, daughter of Edward Boscawen. On 2 June 1742 he married Jemima, daughter of Charles Montagu of Durham and granddaughter of Edward Montagu, 1st Earl of Sandwich; they had no children. Edward Montagu (1692–1776), of Sandleford, was a brother-in-law.

Through the influence of his uncle Hugh Boscawen, 1st Viscount Falmouth, Meadows was returned to Parliament for Penryn in 1722 and for Truro in 1727. In 1734 he was nominated Member for Tavistock by the Duke of Bedford. All his recorded votes were against the government and he did not stand in 1741. In 1757 he succeeded his father and in 1758 he was appointed Knight Marshal, one of the judges (along with the Lord Steward of the Household) of the Marshalsea Court. He held this office until his death. By 1761, Sidney Meadows was Deputy Ranger of Richmond Park when Prime Minister John Stuart, 3rd Earl of Bute was Ranger. Sidney's brother, Philip (d.1781), was Deputy Ranger of Windsor Park.

References

1690s births
1792 deaths
British MPs 1722–1727
British MPs 1727–1734
British MPs 1734–1741
Members of the Parliament of Great Britain for Penryn
Members of the Parliament of Great Britain for Truro
Members of the Parliament of Great Britain for Tavistock